The Battle of Lesbos  took place from 21 November – 21 December 1912 during the First Balkan War, resulting in the capture of the eastern Aegean island of Lesbos by the Kingdom of Greece.

Background
The island of Lesbos had been ruled by the Ottoman Empire since 1462, when it was  conquered by Sultan Mehmed II from the Genoese Gattilusio family that had ruled it for over a century. Named  after its capital, Mytilene, the island remained continuously under Ottoman rule until 1912, disrupted only by brief Venetian occupations in the First and Second Ottoman–Venetian wars. The large majority of the island's population remained Greek Christian, although there was a significant Muslim population accounting for up to a fifth of the total, who lived throughout the island. Relations between the two communities were generally good, and Lesbians were often bilingual in both Greek and Turkish. The port of Mytilene was one of the busiest in the Aegean Sea, and the island was relatively wealthy from trade, exporting many agricultural goods of its own, as well as benefiting from its geographical location on the major shipping routes. This prosperity also contributed to the island not participating in the Greek War of Independence in 1821–1829.

With the outbreak of the First Balkan War in October 1912, the Greek fleet under Rear Admiral Pavlos Koundouriotis seized the strategic island of Lemnos at the entrance of the Dardanelles Straits, and proceeded to establish a naval blockade of the Straits. With the Ottoman fleet confined behind the Daradanelles, the Greeks were left with complete control of the Aegean Sea, and began occupying the Ottoman-ruled Aegean islands. Most of these islands had few or no troops, apart from the larger islands of Chios and Lesbos; the latter was garrisoned by the 2nd Battalion of the 18th Infantry Regiment. The Ottoman garrison numbered 3,600 men, of whom 1,600 were professional soldiers, with the rest being irregulars and drafted Christians, commanded by Major Abdul Ghani Pasha whose headquarters were based in Molyvos.

As a result, the Greeks delayed moving against Chios and Lesbos until operations were concluded on the main front in Macedonia and forces could be spared for a serious assault. With rumours of a cease-fire circulating in late November, the speedy capture of these islands became imperative. Another factor was Bulgaria's rapid advance in Thrace and eastern Macedonia. Τhe Greek government feared that Bulgaria may use Lesbos as a bargaining chip during the course of future peace negotiations. An ad hoc force was assembled for capturing Lesbos: naval infantry detachments were gathered at Mudros Bay and boarded on the cruiser Averoff and the steamer Pelops, along with some light naval artillery and two machine guns.

Fight for Lesbos

After negotiations, the Ottoman garrison was given time to evacuate the city, which was promptly occupied by the Greek forces. After this was accomplished, Kountouriotis with the main part of the fleet left the island, leaving behind only the cruiser squadron and two destroyers. Prior to his departure, Kountouriotis formed a militia composed of local Greeks and appointed K. Melas as its commander. The camp, erected during the recent Italo-Turkish War, was well supplied with provisions and munitions.

During the course of the Battle of Lesbos, the Ottomans perpetrated a series of massacres against the local Greek Christian population. For the moment, the Greeks at Mytilene, some 1,600 men, remained passive, advancing only a few smaller detachments to the interior as a covering force. With the forces on the island manifestly insufficient to complete its capture, the Greek general headquarters sent reinforcements in the form of 2nd Battalion/19th Infantry Regiment, additional naval infantry, and six mountain guns, and placed the operation under the command of Colonel Apollodoros Syrmakezis.

This force was divided in two columns, a southern one at the village of Lambou Myloi and a northern one at Thermi. By the night of the next day, they had reached the villages of Dafia and Agia Paraskevi respectively. As Syrmakezis wanted both columns to hit Filia simultaneously, he ordered the northern column halt for a day, while the advance of the southern column continued the next day, only to be stopped by strong Ottoman resistance near the Leimonas Monastery.

On the next morning, both columns were ordered to launch their attack on Filia, but almost as soon as the Greek advance began, an Ottoman envoy appeared requesting an armistice for negotiations. This was granted, but when the Ottoman commander, Major Abdul Ghani, appeared at 11:00, he claimed that he had not requested negotiations and that he had no proposals to make. Dismissing this as a ploy to gain time, the Greek commander ordered the resumption of the offensive at 14:00. At 22:00, however, the same Ottoman envoy appeared, carrying a letter of surrender signed by the officers of the Ottoman garrison. Syrmakezis ordered an immediate cessation of hostilities, and the instrument of surrender of the Ottoman garrison was signed at 08:00 on the next day.

The capture of Lesbos cost the Greeks nine killed and 81 wounded in action.

Aftermath
The fate of the Aegean islands captured by Greece during the First Balkan War was the subject of prolonged diplomatic negotiations, as the Ottomans initially refused to cede them. Finally, in the Treaty of London, the fate of the islands was placed in the hands of the Great Powers, who in the event would cede them to Greece in February 1914, apart from the two closest to the Dardanelles, Imbros and Tenedos. Nevertheless, the Ottoman Empire was not reconciled to their loss, and a naval arms race followed, leading to a crisis in summer 1914 in which a new Greco-Turkish war appeared imminent; the crisis ended only through the outbreak of the First World War. When the German cruiser  entered Ottoman service in August 1914, she was renamed  in token of these claims.

The cession of Lesbos and the other islands to Greece was not finalized  until the 1923 Treaty of Lausanne.

References

Sources

 
 
 
 
 
 
 

1912 in Greece
1912 in the Ottoman Empire
Amphibious operations
Lesbos 1912
Lesbos 1912
Lesbos 1912
Lesbos
History of Lesbos
November 1912 events